The Minster School can refer to:

 Lincoln Minster School (independent) in Lincolnshire
 The Minster School, Southwell (state) in Nottinghamshire
 The Minster School, York (independent) in York
 Lytchett Minster School (state) in Dorset